Saint-Sauveur-de-Carrouges (literally Saint-Saviour of Carrouges) is a commune in the Orne department in north-western France. As of 2019, the commune had a total population of 252 residents.

See also
Communes of the Orne department
Parc naturel régional Normandie-Maine

References

Saintsauveurdecarrouges